Jaroslav Hrabal (born 8 September 1974) is a retired Slovak footballer who is best known for playing for FC Spartak Trnava. He played 12 matches for the Slovakia national football team between 1999 and 2000.

References

External links
 
 

1974 births
Living people
People from Bánovce nad Bebravou
Sportspeople from the Trenčín Region
Slovak footballers
FC Spartak Trnava players
AS Trenčín players
Slovakia international footballers
Slovak Super Liga players
Association football central defenders